is a 13-episode Japanese anime television series by studio P.A. Works. It aired from October 6 to December 29, 2018, on the Animeism block.

Plot
In 2078, Hitomi Tsukishiro is a teenage girl from a family of witches who lost her sense of colors as she lost the people she treasured. Not wanting to see her granddaughter suffer anymore, Hitomi's grandmother Kohaku Tsukishiro sends her 60 years into the past to 2018 to meet her 17-year-old self.

Characters
 

A colorblind girl who descends from a family of witches. Despite being a witch herself, she hates magic. As she gets older, she lost her senses of colors as well as "people around her". She gets transported back 60 years into the past by her grandmother Kohaku to get a hold of herself again. There, she meets a younger Kohaku and makes new friends. She develops feelings for Yuito and realises the meaning of love.

Kohaku is Hitomi's grandmother who sent Hitomi to live with her 17-year-old self. Kohaku is a troublemaker girl who often does experiments with her magic at school, causing a fear of magic among her classmates. She is initially abroad when Hitomi arrives in the past, and joins the Magic Photography Arts Club after she returned. She works very hard to perfect the time magic to send Hitomi back to her time. She finds happiness by doing magic which make people happy.

A member of the Magic Photography Arts Club whose hobby is drawing. For some reason, Hitomi can see the colors in his drawings. He is an introvert and finds himself similar to Hitomi. He eventually falls in love with her and helps her go back to her time. After Hitomi returns to the future, he eventually writes and illustrates the picture book Hitomi reads as a child.

A member of the Magic Photography Arts Club who likes to taking photos of rabbits. She has crush on her childhood friend Shō.

Vice president of the Magic Photography Arts Club. She was the first to notice and take a video of Hitomi slipping out of Yuito's room and is insistent Hitomi is in a relationship with him or he may have been about to force himself on her. She was also responsible for uploading the video to social media. She is a fun loving cheerful girl. She admires her elder sister the most and wants to be like her.

President of the Magic Photography Arts Club who focuses in taking grayscale pictures. Skeptical of the alleged relationship between Hitomi and Yuito, he was the first to approach and check on her upon noticing Hitomi looked lost and out of place. The high regard he has for Hitomi makes Asagi jealous. He eventually confesses to Hitomi but gets turned down. He takes the rejection very well and continues to support her.

A first year and youngest member of the Magic Photography Arts Club. He is very friendly and especially with Kurumi. They are always bickering with each other.

Production and release
The 13-episode anime television series is animated by studio P.A. Works, directed by Toshiya Shinohara, written by Yuuko Kakihara, with character designs by Fly. Yuki Akiyama serves as chief animation director and is adapting the character designs for animation. Kurumi Suzuki is the series' art director, and Junichi Higashi is the art supervisor. Tomo Namiki and Yoshimitsu Tomita are the directors of photography. Naomi Nakano is the color designer, Tachi Kiritani is the CG director, and Yō Yamada is the sound director. Infinite serves as producer for the project. The series' music is composed by Yoshiaki Dewa. The anime aired from October 6 to December 29, 2018 and was broadcast on the Animeism programming block on MBS, TBS, BS-TBS, AT-X, TUT, and ATV. It was streamed exclusively on Amazon Video worldwide except in China until December 29, 2021, when Hidive began streaming the series on its service worldwide (except for Asia).

In August 2021, Sentai Filmworks announced the acquisition of the series for home video and digital release in North America. The English dub premiered on Hidive on June 19, 2022.

Notes

References

External links
  
 

2018 anime television series debuts
Anime and manga about time travel
Anime with original screenplays
Animeism
Mainichi Broadcasting System original programming
NBCUniversal Entertainment Japan
P.A.Works
Sentai Filmworks
Television series set in 2018
Television series set in the 2070s